Albinia is a feminine given name and a surname. Notable people with the name include:

Given name
 Albinia Hobart (1737/8–1816), British celebrity
 Albinia Jones, known as Albennie Jones (1914–1989), American singer
 Albinia Wherry (1857–1929), British nurse and author

Surname
 Alice Albinia (born 1976), English journalist and author

Feminine given names